Peperomia veraguana is a species of epiphyte from the genus Peperomia. It grows in wet tropical biomes. It was discovered by Ricardo Callejas in 2020.

Etymology
veraguana came from the word "Veraguas". This refers to the species being discovered in Veraguas, Panama.

Distribution
Peperomia veraguana is endemic to Panama. Specimens can be collected at an altitude of 700-1000 meters.

Panama
Veraguas
Santa Fe
Cerro Tute

References

veraguana
Flora of Panama
Plants described in 2020
Taxa named by Ricardo Callejas